Kidz in the Wood is a 1996 television broadcast movie starring Dave Thomas and Julia Duffy. The movie was filmed in 1994 but was not broadcast until 1996.

Plot
A high school history teacher takes a group of students with academic and behavioral issues on a two-week trip recreating the Oregon Trail in attempt to help them graduate. The film follows the students and teachers as they grapple with personality issues and forces of nature.

Cast
Dave Thomas as Tom Foster
Julia Duffy as Felicia Duffy
Candace Cameron Bure as Donna
Alfonso Ribeiro as Morgan
Tatyana Ali as Rita
David Lascher as Sloan
Darius McCrary as Tootooe
Byron Chief-Moon as Brandon Three Tongues
Samuel Vincent as Marvin / Dr. Doom
Andy Berman as Barry
Ryan Brown as Larry
Don S. Davis as Principal Dunbar
Garry Chalk as Coach

References

External links
 

1996 films
1996 comedy films
Films set in Oregon
American teen comedy films
Films with screenplays by Neal Israel
Films directed by Neal Israel
NBC network original films
1990s English-language films
1990s American films